Benny Chan Muk-sing (24 October 1961 – 23 August 2020) was a Hong Kong film director, producer and screenwriter. He is best known for his feature films such as A Moment of Romance, Big Bullet, Who Am I?, Rob-B-Hood, New Police Story, Shaolin, The White Storm, Call of Heroes, and Raging Fire.

He was fluent in English, Mandarin and Cantonese and was nominated for Best Director six times at the Hong Kong Film Awards, include Big Bullet, Heroic Duo, New Police Story, Connected, The White Storm and Raging Fire. His last film, Raging Fire, earned him  Best Director award at the 40th Hong Kong Film Awards and the film went on to win Best Film award at the ceremony.

Benny Chan died of nasopharyngeal cancer in Hong Kong Sanatorium & Hospital.

Life and career 
Born and raised in Kowloon, Benny Chan first accepted a job in 1981 at Rediffusion Television working in continuity. The following year, he joined TVB, becoming a production assistant to Johnnie To. By 1985, Chan had worked his way up to being a television director, co-directing television series like The Flying Fox of Snowy Mountain (1985). In addition to directing most of the episodes of The Flying Fox of Snowy Mountain, he also wrote the scripts for all 40 episodes. Chan had gained experience as an executive director for a couple of films between 1987 and 1988, and had also directed and produced a few television series for Asia Television in 1989.

Chan's debut as a film director began with A Moment of Romance (1990), which was produced by To. During the 1990s, he directed films like Big Bullet (1996), Who Am I? (1998), and Gen-X Cops (1999). For his work on Big Bullet, which he co-wrote, directed, and produced, Chan was nominated for Best Director at the 1997 Hong Kong Film Awards. The film also won awards for Best Film Editing at both the Hong Kong Film Awards and the 1996 Golden Horse Film Festival. He also continued to work in television, directing episodes of the 1995 adaptation of Fist of Fury starring Donnie Yen.

Working in exclusively the film industry since 1998's Who Am I?, Chan continued to work on various projects. Since Who Am I?, he continued to direct more of Jackie Chan's movies, such as New Police Story (2004), Rob-B-Hood (2006), and Shaolin (2011). He also directed Heroic Duo (2003), Divergence (2005), Connected (2008), and The White Storm (2013). Prior to his death, Chan was working on Raging Fire, which he gave to a colleague to complete post-production work after his cancer diagnosis.

Illness and death 
In 2019, Chan was diagnosed with nasopharyngeal cancer after feeling unwell while working on Raging Fire. During the last few months of his life, he was hospitalized at Prince of Wales Hospital.

On 23 August 2020, Chan died at the Hong Kong Sanatorium & Hospital in Wan Chai, Hong Kong.

Filmography

Feature film 
This is a list of 30 feature films which was made by Benny Chan. Most of his films are credited as a director, producer and screenwriter, others are noted.

Television film 
 Fist of Fury 精武門 (1995) - TV series, as a director

Awards and nominations

References

External links 

 
 HK Cinemagic entry

Articles containing traditional Chinese-language text
Articles containing simplified Chinese-language text
Articles containing Chinese-language text
Hong Kong film directors
Hong Kong film producers
Hong Kong screenwriters
1961 births
Living people